The Patriot (French: Le patriote) is a 1938 French historical drama film directed by Maurice Tourneur and starring Harry Baur, Pierre Renoir and Suzy Prim. The film was based on a novel by Alfred Neumann which had previously been turned into a 1928 American silent film The Patriot starring Emil Jannings. It was made by the French subsidiary of the German company Tobis Film. The sets were designed by the Russian-born art director Alexandre Lochakoff.

The film portrays the life of Tsar Paul I of Russia.

Cast
 Harry Baur as Le tsar Paul 1er
 Pierre Renoir as Pahlen
 Suzy Prim as Anna Ostermann  
 Jacques Varennes as Panin
 Elmire Vautier as La tsarine
 Geller  
 Nicolas Rimsky as Yocov 
 André Carnège as Zoubov 
 Fernand Mailly as L'amiral 
 Jacques Mattler as Le commandant disgrâcié  
 Robert Seller as Narichkine  
 André Varennes as Le ministre de la guerre  
 Victor Vina
 Paula Clère as L'espionne  
 Gérard Landry as Le tsarévitch
 Colette Darfeuil as Lopouchina  
 Josette Day as Nadia 
 Jacques Berlioz as Un diplomate  
 Roméo Carlès 
 Marguerite de Morlaye 
 Maurice Devienne
 Ernest Ferny as Le juge

References

Bibliography 
 Waldman, Harry. Maurice Tourneur: The Life and Films. McFarland, 2001.

External links 
 

1938 films
French historical drama films
1930s historical drama films
1930s French-language films
Films directed by Maurice Tourneur
Films set in Russia
Films set in the 1800s
Films scored by Jacques Ibert
French remakes of American films
Films about assassinations
Cultural depictions of Paul I of Russia
French black-and-white films
1938 drama films
1930s French films